Sergei Nikolayevich Nikolayev (born 24 September 1978) is a former Russian football player.

References

1978 births
Living people
Russian footballers
FC Torpedo NN Nizhny Novgorod players
FC Lokomotiv Nizhny Novgorod players
Russian Premier League players
Association football forwards